The 1st Mechanized Corps was a mechanized corps of the Red Army during World War II, formed twice.

World War II

1st Formation
Initially formed in March 1940 it was attached to the Leningrad Military District, and held in reserve near the Pskov Fortified Region. It was under the command of Major General Mikhail Chernyavsky when the German Operation Barbarossa began in June 1941. It initially comprised the 1st and 3rd Tank Divisions, and the 168th Mechanized Division. On 22 June 1941, 1st Mechanized Corps consisted 31,439 Men, 1037 Tanks, 239 Armored Cars, 148 Artillery Pieces, 146 Mortars, 4730 Vehicles, 246 Tractors & 467 Motorcycles including lighter models T-26, Bt 7, & T-28's.

After the invasion began the Leningrad Military District was renamed Northern Front, Commanded by Lieutenant General Markian M. Popov. The front fielded 14th, 7th Armies, 23rd Armies, the 65th Rifle Corps & the Leningrad Military District forces including the 2nd Division of NKVD troops. The 1st Mechanized Corps was heavily engaged in the first battles of Operation Barbarossa, particularly during the Baltic Operation (1941). On 29 June 1941 the 1st Mechanized Corps was ordered to reinforce new defenses anchored on the Velikaya River near Ostrov on the former Stalin Line after the spectacular advances by Georg-Hans Reinhardt's XLI Panzer Corps which had crossed the Daugava River. However it was unable to hold the line. On 11 July 1941 Col P Poluboiarov, Northwestern Front armoured directorate reported that the 1st Mechanized Corps had at the present moment fewer than 100 Tanks remaining. Pskov and Ostrov were captured within weeks & Leningrad invested. On 2 August 1941 Colonel Limarenko, Chief of Staff of the 1st Mechanized Corps reported that the Corps 'possessed no T-34 or Kv-1s when sent into action 20 were delivered only after combat began. The 1st Mechanized Corps was disbanded in August 1941, although 1st Tank Division remained in 14th Army.

2nd Formation
The Corps was formed a second time on the basis of the 27th Tank Corps on 8 September 1942 in Kalinin.

It fought actively during the Second World War from 26 September 1942 to 10 March 1943, from 9 July 1943 to 13 January 1944, from 7 June 1944 to 5 September 1944 and from 30 October 1944 to 9 May 1945.
It took heavy casualties during the Battle in Berlin.
 
After the end of World War II, the Corps became part of the Group of Soviet Occupation Forces in Germany.

Cold War
In 1946, the corps became the 1st Mechanized Division. The division became the 19th Motor Rifle Division in Olympisches Dorf as part of the 2nd Guards Tank Army. In June 1964, it was subordinated to the 20th Guards Army. On 1 January 1965, it became the 35th Motor Rifle Division. On 22 February 1968, the division was awarded the Order of the Red Banner. In May 1983, it relocated to Krampnitz. In May 1989, the 219th Tank Regiment was moved to the Soviet Union and disbanded. It was replaced by the 32nd Guards Tank Division's 69th Motor Rifle Regiment. During the Cold War, the division was maintained at full strength. In December 1991, the division moved to Chebarkul and became part of the Volga–Urals Military District. The division was disbanded in April 1992.

Sources & References

Further reading 
 Steven H Newton, 'Panzer Operations on the Eastern Front- The Memoirs of General Raus 1941-1945' (2003) Da Capo Press 
 David Glantz (1998), 'Stumbling Colossus – The Red Army on the Eve of World War', Kansas. 
 David Glantz (2002), 'The Battle for Leningrad 1941-1944', Kansas. 
 Christer Bergstrom, (2007) 'Barbarossa – The Air Battle: July–December 1941, Ian Allan Publishing.

01
Military units and formations established in 1941
Military units and formations disestablished in 1946
Military units and formations awarded the Order of the Red Banner